The 1963 Detroit Titans football team represented the University of Detroit as an independent during the 1963 NCAA University Division football season. In their second year under head coach John Idzik, the Titans compiled a 2–6–1 record and were outscored by opponents by a combined total of 221 to 116.

The team's statistical leaders included Tom Zientek with 574 passing yards, Fred Beier with 766 rushing yards and 48 points scored, and George Walkosky with 135 receiving yards.

Schedule

References

External links
 1963 University of Detroit football programs

Detroit
Detroit Titans football seasons
Detroit Titans football
Detroit Titans football